DnaJ heat shock protein family (Hsp40) member C12 is a protein that in humans is encoded by the DNAJC12 gene.

Function

This gene encodes a member of a subclass of the HSP40/DnaJ protein family. Members of this family of proteins are associated with complex assembly, protein folding, and export. Two transcript variants encoding distinct isoforms have been identified for this gene.

Pathology
Mutations of the gene cause mild non-BH4-deficient hyperphenylalaninemia (HPANBH4), also called DNAJC12-deficient hyperphenylalaninemia or DNAJC12 deficiency.

References

Further reading 

Human proteins